Clawfinger is a Swedish rap metal band from Stockholm. The group is known for aggressive but melodic music and tackling political and anti-racist themes in their songs.

History

Origins: 1989–1991 
The band's origin dates back to mid-1989, when Zak Tell and Jocke Skog met while working together at Rosenlund Hospital in Stockholm. In 1990, they were joined by the Norwegian guitarists Bård Torstensen and Erlend Ottem who were also working at the hospital. The four soon realized their similar interests in music. Bård and Erlend played previously in a band called Theo in their hometown Arendal in Norway. They invested their free time exploring the musical world, composing and writing songs while eventually evolving into a band.

Deaf Dumb Blind: 1992–1993  
Their original demo comprising three tracks ("Waste of Time", "Nigger" and "Profit Preacher") quickly secured local radio airplay for them and consequently brought them to the attention of the music label MVG Records. "Nigger" is an anti-racism statement that caused quite a stir and was a massive success; it was also released as a single. By the beginning of the 1990s, Clawfinger self-released their debut Deaf Dumb Blind. This sold over 600,000 copies worldwide and was critically acclaimed by the Swedish press. With the addition of André Skaug and drummer Morten Skaug, Clawfinger went on tour and played at European festivals, including opening for Anthrax and Alice in Chains.

Use Your Brain: 1994–1995 

The band received many awards, including two Grammies "at home" during the Swedish Grammy Awards in 1994 for best hard rock band and for best music video. After the subsequent touring, they went straight back in the studio to record their second album, Use Your Brain. The album was released 1995 and yet another touring campaign followed, most notably participating at Ozzy Osbourne's Monsters of Rock Festival in Argentina, Brazil and Chile in that year, rocking alongside American metal counterparts like Megadeth, Faith No More and Alice Cooper. Back in Europe they continued the touring campaign by taking part at festivals and countless gigs.

Self-titled album: 1996–1998  

Their self-titled album Clawfinger was released in 1997. The first song on the album is "Two Sides", which expanded the band's reach by using female choir vocals and a Middle Eastern sound. The rest of the album continues with the band's typical aggressive voice and socio-political lyrics.

Clawfinger contains 12 songs with an additional three bonus tracks on the limited edition. They released three singles and two videos (Biggest & the Best and Two Sides).

A Whole Lot of Nothing: 1999–2001  
A Whole Lot of Nothing was the fourth album released on 23 July 2001. The music showcases the same aggressive guitars, with more distortion effects and sounds, adding a new level of diversification. Synthesizers are much more present on this particular album than on any other of Clawfinger's works.

A Whole Lot of Nothing contains 13 tracks and two bonus tracks on the limited edition. Clawfinger also released four singles, two of which are limited editions.

Zeroes & Heroes: 2002–2004  
Zeros & Heroes caused controversy upon its 2003 release in America due to open critique of former head of state George W. Bush and US military politics following the 11 September 2001 attacks, particularly in the song "Step Aside". It offers yet another change of style for the listener. The electronic sound and synthesizers from A Whole Lot of Nothing are gone and replaced by a more complex and melodic guitar riffing.

Hate Yourself with Style: 2005–2006 

Hate Yourself with Style was released in 2005. The album continued the path entered on Zeros & Heroes and is characterized by hard rock style melodic speedy guitar riffs. The keyboards which particularly characterized A Whole Lot of Nothing have gone completely.

Unlike previous albums, where the limited edition featured two or more bonus-tracks, the limited edition of this album features a DVD with live footage from the Greenfield festival and video clips of all singles up to Clawfinger's third album.

Life Will Kill You: 2007–2011 
Life Will Kill You was released in 2007. It has spawned three singles: "Prisoners", "The Price We Pay" and "Little Baby".

In 2008 and 2009, the band played at the biggest open-air festival in Europe (400,000–500,000 rock fans every year)—Przystanek Woodstock in Poland.

Disbandment and reunions: 2012–present 

Clawfinger had been working on a re-recording of their debut album Deaf Dumb Blind. The plan was to re-record all the album's songs, additionally featuring guest musicians. Zak Tell has stated, that talks were held with members of Rammstein  and Peter Tägtgren from the bands Pain and Hypocrisy.

On 24 August 2013, the band's Facebook page announced that the group is disbanding.

On 5 October 2013, another announcement was made that Jocke Skog had joined the Swedish death metal band Feared as their new bassist.

In May 2014, the Facebook page of the band announced a one-off show at the ZAKHID festival in Ukraine on 8 August 2014. The band has been occasional one-off reunion shows since then, performing two in 2015, two in 2016 for Denmark's CopenHell Festival and Bulgaria's Summer Chaos Festival, and most recently on the Irreversible Festival 2017 in Monthey, Switzerland.

On 4 August 2017, the band released the new single "Save Our Souls" via iTunes and YouTube. Another single, "Tear You Down", was released on 4 October 2019. On 11 Juni 2022, they performed at Sweden Rock Festival.

Members

Current line-up
 Zak Tell – lead vocals (1989-2013, 2017–present)
 Jocke Skog – keyboards, backing vocals (1989-2013, 2017–present)
Bård Torstensen – lead guitar (2003-2013, 2017–present), rhythm guitar (1990-2013, 2017–present)
André Skaug – bass (1992-2013, 2017–present)
Micke Dahlén – drums (2008-2013, 2017–present)

Former members
Erlend Ottem – lead guitar (1990–2003)
Morten Skaug – drums (1992–94)
Ottar Vigerstøl – drums (1994–97)
Henka Johansson – drums (1997–2008)

Timeline

Discography

Deaf Dumb Blind (1993)
Use Your Brain (1995)
Clawfinger (1997)
A Whole Lot of Nothing (2001)
Zeros & Heroes (2003)
Hate Yourself with Style (2005)
Life Will Kill You (2007)

References

External links

 Official website
 
 The Belgian Clawfinger pages (in English)
 

Musical groups established in 1989
Musical quintets
Nuclear Blast artists
Swedish nu metal musical groups
English-language singers from Sweden
Clawfinger